Airavata is a nonprofit organisation founded by Chenda Clais, Professor François-Xavier Roux and Pierre-Yves Clais, protecting the last captive Asian elephants in Ratanakiri Province in Cambodia, as well as protecting up to 100 hectares of the Katieng forest along the river close to the Katieng Waterfalls 10 Kilometer west from the Ratanakiri capitol, Banlung.

Captive elephants in Cambodia
Wars, and the time during which Cambodia was ruled by the Khmer Rouge reduced the population of Cambodias elephants, both in the wild as well as in captivity. Cambodia is presently home to less than 100 captive Asian elephants, most of them being cared for by private owners in Mondulkiri Province.

Airavata elephants

Presently, Airavata Foundation owns four elephants, two bulls; Bokva, Kamsen, the female Ikeo and her female baby Noelle, which are the last four captive elephants in the Ratanakiri Province. All three of the elephants are from the community forest in Ratanakiri. Airavatas elephants have since April 2019 been trained and the mahout staff coached, by the Swede Dan Koehl .

Bakmai's second chance
The elephant bull Bak Mai killed its previous mahout and owner in Mondulkiri in September 2016, after which Airavata bought the then-32-year-old bull to rehabilitate it and integrate it with their other elephants,  but unfortunately died in May 2020, under mysterious circumstances, including unusual diarrhoea when he was taken in the morning to the nearby river for drinking. He collapsed and could not get up, and died, still lying on the side, apr 16 hours later.

Breeding
Cambodia had not experienced any captive born elephant in over 30 years, when the 38 year old Ikeo gave birth to a female elephant calf on December 26, 2021. The elephant baby was named Noelle.

Activities 
Concentrating on the surviving captive population of Asian elephants in Cambodia, the foundation, recently set under the high patronage of King Norodom Sihamoni of Cambodia, offer guests a number of activities in Katieng forest, including trekking, elephant riding and an educational program.

References

External links
 Airavata Elephant Foundation

Organisations based in Cambodia
Elephant conservation organizations
Foundations based in Cambodia